Patch-Through Access refers to a security clearance used in various applications. According to the application, it may be regarded as a high or a low level security clearance.

 In telephony and some corporate/defense applications, Patch-Through is a low level clearance, only allowing the user to use the telephony station (router) as a method to be put through to another service, sometimes on a national phone network, but more often on a small telephony network owned by the company who provides the service, but not access any services local to the station, or modify the options of the station itself.
 In security and most other corporate applications, Patch-Through is a high level clearance, because it allows the user to utilise company funds in order to make external calls (usually to international or other high-rate locations). In this sense, Patch-Through is useful because it saves employees who work from home for having to get company rebates for expensive calls made on behalf of the company.

Access control
Security